You'll Never Beat the Irish is the sixteenth album by Irish folk and rebel band The Wolfe Tones. This album was the first recorded and released by the band without founding member Derek Warfield, who had departed earlier the same year.

Track listing 
 You'll Never Beat the Irish, Part 1
 The Crossing
 The Rebel
 In Belfast
 Chicago
 We are the Irish
 United Men
 Ireland My Ireland
 Halloween
 Grace
 The Hot Asphalt
 Thank God for America
 Celtic Dreams
 You'll Never Beat the Irish, Part 2

References

External links 
 

The Wolfe Tones albums
2001 albums